A. Vetriazhagan is a member of the Tamil Nadu Legislative Assembly representing the Villivakkam constituency in the 16th Tamil Nadu Assembly. He is the grandson of Perasiriyar K. Anbazhagan who was a financial minister of Tamil Nadu in M.Karunanthi's ministry.

Early life 
Born on 11 September, 1978, A Vertiazhagan completed his schooling at Don Bosco, Egmore and higher secondary at DAV Mogappair. He completed his B.E. Electronics & Communication from Anna University, Chennai followed by an MBA from Annamalai University.

Social Contributions 
Mr. Vetriazhagan contested in the prestigious Senate Constituency of Madras University to be elected for Pachaiyappas Trust Board. Got elected in the year 2009 as Trustee from the Madras University and as Financial Trustee in the Board Member Election. Consecutively, he won the Board Elections and got elected as Financial Trustee for a total period of three terms and served the position of FT (Financial Trustee) from 2009 – 2012. He resigned in the year 2012 from Pachaiyappas Trust Board.

Electoral performance

Offices Held/Holding 

 MLA from Villivakkam constituency (from May 2021 to present) on the 16th Assembly of TN
 Financial trustee of Pachaiyappa's trust board from 2009 – 2012
 Senate Member of Madras University – presently serving
 Founder AV Group
 Managing trustee of AV Educational trust

References 

Tamil Nadu MLAs 2021–2026
Living people
Dravida Munnetra Kazhagam politicians
1978 births